Feminism is a collection of movements aimed at defining, establishing, and defending equal political, economic, and social rights for women. Existentialism is a philosophical and cultural movement which holds that the starting point of philosophical thinking must be the individual and the experiences of the individual, that  moral thinking and scientific thinking together are not sufficient for understanding all of human existence, and, therefore, that a further set of categories, governed by the norm of authenticity, is necessary to understand human existence. (Authenticity, in the context of existentialism, is to recognize the responsibility we have for our existence.)  This philosophy analyzes relationships between the individual and things, or other human beings, and how they limit or condition choice.

Existentialist feminists emphasize concepts such as freedom, interpersonal relationships, and the experience of living as a human body. They value the capacity for radical change, but recognize that factors such as self-deception and the anxiety caused by the possibility of change can limit it. Many are dedicated to exposing and undermining socially imposed gender roles and cultural constructs limiting women's self-determination, and criticize post-structuralist feminists who deny the intrinsic freedom of individual women. A woman who makes considered choices regarding her way of life and suffers the anxiety associated with that freedom, isolation, or nonconformity, yet remains free, demonstrates the tenets of existentialism.  The novels of Kate Chopin, Doris Lessing, Joan Didion, Margaret Atwood, and Margaret Drabble include such existential heroines.

Major Existential Feminists 
Simone de Beauvoir was a renowned existentialist and one of the principal founders of second-wave feminism. Beauvoir examined women's subordinate role as the 'Other', patriarchally forced into immanence in her book, The Second Sex, which some claim to be the culmination of her existential ethics. The book includes the famous line, "One is not born but becomes a woman," introducing what has come to be called the sex-gender distinction. Beauvoir's The Second Sex provided the vocabulary for analyzing the social constructions of femininity and the structure for critiquing those constructions, which was used as a liberating tool by attending to the ways in which patriarchal structures used sexual difference to deprive women of the intrinsic freedom of their "can do" bodies. Some say Beauvoir is farther reaching than Sartre despite often being overlooked in many comprehensive works about existentialist feminism.

Jean-Paul Sartre was a French philosopher, existentialist and phenomenologist who contributed greatly to existential feminism through works like Existential Psychoanalysis. In this work, Sartre claims that the individual is the intersection of universal schemata and he rejects the idea of a pure individual.

Maurice Merleau-Ponty was another French philosopher who contributed many existential works to the field. Many following theorists, such as Judith Butler, critiqued his methods, including his sexual ideology. Other theorists omit him, viewing him as a "Sartre knock-off".

Critiques

Simone de Beauvoir 
Some critiques of the field are of Beauvoir and her portrayal of existentialist feminism specifically. Gwendolyn Dolske critiques that Beauvoir is inconsistent between her works, noting that the women in Beauvoir's fictional works resign to cultural norms rather than conquering their Otherness. Simons critiques Beauvoir's inability to transfer her work in theory into praxis.

Critiques Against Sexism 
However, most of the critiques are of the limitations of the field overall. Margery Collins and Christine Pierce fault Sartre's limited anti-essentialism for his sexist views which Hazel Barnes then refutes. Maryellen MacGuigan criticizes Ortega's view of women's inferiority, Julia Maria's sexuate condition, and Frederick Buyendijk's narrative of women's experience.

Extension to Gender and Race Studies 
Jo-Ann Pilardi outlines the female eroticism in Beauvoir's work and Julien Murphy compares the gaze or look in Sartre to Adrienne Rich. Nancy Potter aligns female incest survivors' experiences with dread and anxiety. Janice McLane uses Merleau-Ponty's Concept of flesh to describe self-mutilation. Shannon Sullivan criticizes Merleau-Ponty's anonymous body. Linda Bell moves Sartre's notion of authenticity from feminist existentialism to feminist ethics. T. Denean Sharpley-Whiting uses Fanon's analyses of racist and colonized subjectivities to discuss feminism.

References

Further reading
Joseph Mahon. Existentialism, Feminism and Simone De Beauvoir. Palgrave Macmillan. 1997.

Types of existentialism
Existentialism